Olaf Solberg is a Norwegian lightweight rower. He won a bronze medal with the lightweight men's four at the 1976 World Rowing Championships in Villach, Austria.

References

Year of birth missing (living people)
Norwegian male rowers
World Rowing Championships medalists for Norway
Living people